Let the People Sing is the fifth album by Irish folk and rebel band The Wolfe Tones. The album features a number of political songs including Come Out Ye Black and Tans and A Nation Once Again

Track listing
 The Snowy-Breasted Pearl
 Sean South of Garryowen
 Twice Daily
 James Connolly
 Don't Stop Me Now
 Taim in Arrears
 Come Out Ye Black and Tans
 On the One Road
 The Men Behind the Wire
 For Ireland, I'd Not Tell Her Name
 Paddy Lie Back
 First of May
 Long Kesh
 A Nation Once Again

The Wolfe Tones albums
1972 albums